Barratt is a surname. Notable people with the surname include:
Alf Barratt (1920–2002), English footballer
Alfred Barratt (1844–1881), English barrister and philosophical writer
Arthur Barratt (1891–1966), British air marshal
W. Augustus Barratt (1873–1947), Scottish-born, later American, songwriter and musician
Barnaby B. Barratt (born 1950), psychoanalyst, specialist in human sexuality
Bethany Barratt (born 1972), American political scientist and author
Bob Barratt (died 2004), British record producer
Brenda Barratt (born 1946), English watercolour painter
Brian Barratt-Boyes (1924–2006), heart surgeon
Bronte Barratt (born 1989), Australian swimmer
Claire Barratt (born 1974), British  industrial archaeologist, steam engineer and television presenter
Colin Barratt  (born 1948), British rower
Craig H. Barratt (born 1962), Australian technology executive
David Barratt, British music composer
Enoch Barratt (1812–1895), Australian nurseryman
Sir Francis Layland-Barratt, 1st Baronet (1860–1933),  British Liberal Party politician
Fred Barratt (1894–1947), cricketer
George Osborne Barratt (1827–1906), confectioner
Harry Barratt (1918–1989), English football player and manager
Henry Barratt (born 1983), English rugby union player
Holly Barratt (born 1988), Australian swimmer
Issie Barratt (born 1964), British composer
Joe Barratt (1895–1968), English footballer
Julian Barratt (born 1968), English actor and musician
Keren Barratt (born 1946), English football referee
Lawrie Barratt (1927–2012), founder of Barratt Developments, housebuilders
Legh Barratt (1871–1950), English cricketer
Les Barratt (born 1945), English footballer
Mary Barratt Due (1888–1969),  Norwegian pianist
Matilda M. Barratt (1837–1902), member of the first-ever general presidency of the Primary organization of the Church of Jesus Christ of Latter-day Saints
Michael Barratt (astronaut) (born 1959), astronaut
Michael Barratt (television presenter) (born 1928), British television presenter
Michael Barratt Brown (1918–2015), British economist, political activist and adult educator
Nick Barratt (born 1970), English genealogist
Norman Barratt, guitarist and songwriter
Paul Barratt (1944–2021), senior Australian public servant and policymaker
Percy Barratt (1898–1974), English footballer
Reginald Barratt (1920–1977), actor
Richard Barratt (1928–2013), Chief Inspector of Constabulary
Roy Barratt (1942–1995), English cricketer
Stephan Henrik Barratt-Due (1919–1985), Norwegian violinist and music teacher
Stephan Barratt-Due (born 1956), Norwegian violinist
Ted Barratt (1844–1891), English cricketer
Terry Barratt (born 1971), English cricketer
Thomas Barratt (1895–1917), Victoria Cross recipient
Thomas Ball Barratt (1862–1940), Norwegian pastor
Thomas J. Barratt (1841–1914), pioneer of mass advertising
Tony Barratt (born 1965), English footballer
Virginia Barratt (born 1959), Australian artist
Will Barratt, American cinematographer and producer
William Barratt (1823–1889), English convert to Mormonism
William Cross Barratt (1862–1940), senior British Army and British Indian Army officer

Given name
Barratt O'Hara (1882–1969), U.S. Congressman from Illinois
Barratt Waugh (born 1979), British countertenor singer

English-language surnames